WAOW (channel 9) is a television station in Wausau, Wisconsin, United States, affiliated with ABC and owned by Allen Media Broadcasting. The station's studios are located on Grand Avenue/US 51 in Wausau, and its transmitter is located on Rib Mountain.

WAOW relays its signal on satellite station WMOW (channel 4) in Crandon, extending its range in the northeastern reaches of the market.

History
WAOW signed on the air on June 12, 1965. It was owned by Mid - Continent Broadcasting. It served as a satellite station of Madison's WKOW as part of the Wisconsin Television Network which would later include WXOW in La Crosse and WQOW in Eau Claire. Midcontinent Broadcasting sold the stations to Horizon Communications in 1970. Liberty Television bought the stations in 1978. This station gradually increased its local programming and content, finally severing the electronic umbilical cord with WKOW in the 1980s.

In 1985, Liberty Television sold the Wisconsin stations to Tak Communications. Tak filed for Chapter 11 bankruptcy protection in 1991 and would be taken over by a group of creditors less than three years later. In 1995, Shockley Communications purchased WAOW along with three sister stations (WKOW, WXOW, and WQOW) from Tak's creditors. Quincy Newspapers purchased most of the Shockley stations, including its Wisconsin sister stations in June 2001.

Between 1994 and 1999, WAOW carried the Fox network's National Football League game package, which featured most games of the home state Green Bay Packers. The arrangement was necessary due to a lack of a local, over-the-air Fox affiliate in the Wausau–Rhinelander market. (Area cable systems primarily carried Fox through the Foxnet service or through Green Bay's WGBA-TV or WLUK-TV.) WAOW's arrangement with Fox came to an end in December 1999, when the Wittenberg-licensed WFXS (channel 55) signed on to become Central Wisconsin's first full-time Fox station.

On June 25, 2002, WAOW became the first commercial television station in the Wausau–Rhinelander market to broadcast in high-definition; WYOW would join them on October 24.

WAOW/WYOW converted fully to digital on February 17, 2009 without a nightlight period for WAOW while WYOW converted after a nightlight period. The two stations carried the Retro Television Network (RTV) on a third digital subchannel until March 2009. In the beginning of that month, it was replaced with This TV. On September 1, 2015, Decades replaced This TV.

In February and March, WAOW aired WFXS' digital signal temporarily on DT3 while that station ironed out problems with the activation of its digital transmitter. In early September 2009, WFXS added RTV to its third digital subchannel.

Sale to Allen Media Group
On January 7, 2021, Quincy Media announced that it had put itself up for sale.  On February 1, Gray Television announced it would purchase Quincy's radio and TV properties for $925 million.  As Gray already own's WSAW-TV in the Wausau–Rhinelander market, and both that station and WAOW rank among the market's top four stations, it agreed to sell WAOW in order to satisfy FCC requirements.

On April 29, Gray announced that WAOW and WMOW would be divested to Allen Media Broadcasting in a $380 million deal that includes, among other Quincy-owned stations, WKOW/Madison, WXOW/La Crosse, and WQOW/Eau Claire. Gray, however, kept WYOW, and converted the Eagle River station into a full-power satellite of WSAW-TV, airing The CW on its main 34.1 channel and simulcasting CBS & Fox on subchannels 7.10 and 33.10, respectively.

News operation

In 2000, WAOW entered into a news share agreement with WFXS (owned by Davis Television, LLC). The arrangement resulted in a weeknight prime time newscast debuting on the Fox outlet. The broadcast, known as Fox 55 News at 9, could be seen for thirty minutes.

Although there was no weekend edition of the show, it was eventually joined by a weekday morning newscast (also produced by WAOW) on April 23, 2012. Known as Fox 55 This Morning, this program aired for an hour (from 7 until 8) on WFXS offering a local alternative to the national morning programs seen on the big three networks. Both WFXS newscasts maintained a separate music package and graphics scheme from WAOW. The broadcasts originated from the ABC outlet's primary set at its studios but with unique duratrans indicating the Fox-branded shows. On June 19, 2011, WAOW became the market's second television outlet to upgrade local news to a high definition level. Included in the change were a redesigned set and an updated graphics scheme. Eventually, in 2012, WFXS made the transition to HD newscasts.

On July 1, 2015, concurrent with the Fox affiliation moving to low-powered WZAW-LD, both of the Fox-branded newscasts were canceled after the news share arrangement was terminated. Almost a week later (on July 6), WAOW introduced its own prime time news at 9 (airing weeknights for a half-hour) on its CW digital subchannel. This broadcast, known as Newsline 9 at 9 on The CW, can also be seen through a simulcast on WMOW's main channel and WYOW-DT2.

Since the station went on the air in 1965, it has maintained a weather beacon in the form of a sign or tower that is lit in various colors to convey the forecast for the next 12 to 24 hours. The "9" sign on the side of the WAOW studios currently serves this purpose. A poem created by a viewer contest helps to remember the meaning of the colors:

When the Weather 9 is red; warmer weather is ahead.
When the Weather 9 is green; cooler weather is foreseen.
When the Weather 9 is white; little change is in sight.
When the Weather 9 is flashing by night or day; precipitation is on the way.

Subchannels
The station's digital signal is multiplexed:

Satellite stations
In addition to its main signal, WAOW operates one satellite station that provides additional coverage and some overlap. The station formerly operated WYOW which was sold to Gray Television in 2021.

WMOW

WMOW (channel 4) in Crandon operates as a full-time satellite of WAOW. Besides its transmitter, WMOW does not maintain any physical presence locally in Crandon.

In mid-February 2009, Quincy announced the purchase of Crandon-based WBIJ, a FamilyNet affiliate, which was sold to Quincy by the widow of the station's founder. Plans called for the conversion of the station to a second satellite of WAOW to serve the northeastern portion of the market near the Michigan border after completing the station's digital VHF channel 12 transmitter facilities. Quincy has since renamed the station WMOW to conform with the call letters of WAOW and the remainder of Quincy's network of ABC affiliates throughout the state which all carry a "OW" suffix. Quincy put WMOW on the air June 4, 2010.

WYOW

WYOW (channel 34) in Eagle River operated as a semi-satellite of WAOW serving Rhinelander. As such, it simulcast all network and syndicated programming as provided through its parent, but aired separate legal identifications and local commercial inserts. However, this slightly different feed was seen exclusively over the air as only WAOW had been offered on cable and satellite providers in the market. Although WYOW maintained an advertising sales office on West Pine Street/WIS 17/WIS 70 in Eagle River and transmitter facilities in unincorporated Oneida County (between Sugar Camp and Three Lakes), master control and most internal operations were based at WAOW's studios. WYOW was identified on-air as "Northwoods 34" based on north-central Wisconsin's namesake as a popular vacation and retirement destination in the Upper Midwestern United States. It also serves the western portion of Michigan's Upper Peninsula although the off-air signal reach is limited to areas around Iron River and Watersmeet.

WYOW's first broadcast to viewers in Northern Wisconsin and the Western Upper Peninsula of Michigan was on January 4, 1997 under the ownership of Northwoods Educational Television. Shockley operated the station through a local marketing agreement (LMA) until Shockley successfully purchased it outright in December 1998.

WYOW did not maintain any news-related personnel at its Eagle River office. However, there was a specific section on WAOW's website featuring "Northwoods 34" branded headlines as provided through WAOW's regional coverage.

As of August 2021, the station is owned by Gray Television and rebroadcasts WSAW-TV.

References

External links
 

Television channels and stations established in 1965
1965 establishments in Wisconsin
Entertainment Studios
AOW
ABC network affiliates
Decades (TV network) affiliates
This TV affiliates
Court TV affiliates
True Crime Network affiliates